Giuseppe Baldini (11 March 1922 – 26 November 2009) was an Italian football player and manager. During his playing career, Baldini played at both professional and international levels as a striker, before becoming a football manager.

Career
Born in Russi, Baldini began his career as a youth player with Pontedera, before turning professional with Fiorentina in 1939. Baldini later played club football for Internazionale, Andrea Doria, Sampdoria, Genoa and Como, as well as making one appearance for the Italian national side in 1949.

After retiring from the game he became a football manager, and managed Como, Sampdoria, Savona, Virtus Entella and Avellino.

External links
Giuseppe BALDINI – INTER 

1922 births
2009 deaths
People from Russi
Italian footballers
Italy international footballers
Italian football managers
Serie A players
Serie B players
ACF Fiorentina players
Inter Milan players
U.C. Sampdoria players
Genoa C.F.C. players
U.S. Città di Pontedera players
Association football forwards
Footballers from Emilia-Romagna
Sportspeople from the Province of Ravenna